Sam Houston Schoolhouse State Historic Site is a single-room log cabin-style schoolhouse in Maryville, Tennessee, built in 1794.  Sam Houston taught at the school as a young man, before the War of 1812.

Open to the public, the schoolhouse is a Tennessee state historic site operated under an agreement with the Tennessee Historical Commission. It was listed on the National Register of Historic Places in 1972.

The school house was originally built by a Revolutionary War veteran, Andrew Kennedy along with Henry McCulloch and other neighbors.

The National Heritage Area Program and Blount County Tennessee: A Feasibility Study says “Sometime after his arrival in Tennessee, probably in 1794, Kennedy and Henry McCulloch joined with some neighbors to construct a small log schoolhouse in a clearing less than a mile from the Kennedy home. No definitive explanation can now be given for the decision to locate the schoolhouse at the somewhat unusual site more than a half-mile from Little River. Presumably its proximity to the refreshing spring which flows nearby and perhaps its central position in relation to the original builders' homes were factors in the selection of the site.”

References

External links
Sam Houston Historic Schoolhouse

School buildings completed in 1794
School buildings on the National Register of Historic Places in Tennessee
Buildings and structures in Blount County, Tennessee
Museums in Blount County, Tennessee
Education museums in the United States
Defunct schools in Tennessee
Tennessee State Historic Sites
History museums in Tennessee
Sam Houston
National Register of Historic Places in Blount County, Tennessee
1794 establishments in the Southwest Territory